Carlos Alberto Canobbio Bentaberry (born 7 January 1982) is a Uruguayan former footballer who played as a central defender, currently assistant manager of Liverpool Montevideo.

Club career
Born in Montevideo, Canobbio started playing professionally with C.A. Progreso, going on to represent in his homeland Deportivo Colonia and C.A. Rentistas. He competed abroad the next four years, with Spain's AD Cerro de Reyes, CD Onda, CD Buñol and CD Olímpic de Xàtiva and Greek club Makedonikos FC, always in the lower leagues.

In 2011, Canobbio returned to his country and Progreso, recently returned to the Primera División. He was still part of the squad – as well as captain – when they managed another promotion six years later, with his brother acting as chairman.

Personal life
Canobbio's older brother, Fabián, was also a footballer. A midfielder, he also played in Spain but with much more success, notably winning La Liga and the UEFA Cup with Valencia CF; they shared teams at Progreso.

References

External links

1982 births
Living people
Uruguayan footballers
Footballers from Montevideo
Association football defenders
Uruguayan Primera División players
Uruguayan Segunda División players
C.A. Progreso players
C.A. Rentistas players
Danubio F.C. players
Segunda División B players
Tercera División players
AD Cerro de Reyes players
CD Olímpic de Xàtiva footballers
Uruguayan expatriate footballers
Expatriate footballers in Spain
Expatriate footballers in Greece
Uruguayan expatriate sportspeople in Spain
Uruguayan expatriate sportspeople in Greece